St Sebastian is a c.1507 painting of St Sebastian by Perugino. It is thought to be an autograph copy of his original in the Louvre - it is near identical to that work, only lacking its inscription and its ruins. It is now in the São Paulo Museum of Art.

References

Paintings by Pietro Perugino
1507 paintings
Paintings in the collection of the São Paulo Museum of Art
Perugino